John Bryce (14 September 1833 – 17 January 1913) was a New Zealand politician from 1871 to 1891 and Minister of Native Affairs from 1879 to 1884. In his attitudes to Māori land questions, he favoured strict legal actions against Māori opposed to alienation, and he personally directed the invasion of Parihaka and the arrest of the leaders of the movement.

Described as being stubborn and embittered to Māori questions, Bryce was the public face of a harsh policy towards Māori, but his actions were supported by the Premier and other members of his cabinet.

Early life
John Bryce arrived in New Zealand as a child in 1840, and had little formal education.

After a short time in the Australian gold-fields in 1851, he purchased a farm near Wanganui and remained a farmer for the next fifty years.

Early political career

In 1859, Bryce started his political career. By 1862 he was representing his area in the Wellington Provincial Council, and by 1866 was the Member of Parliament (MP) for Wanganui, a position he held for only a year before resigning due to ill-health.

Titokowaru's War

When settlers were threatened by Māori led by Tītokowaru in 1867, Bryce volunteered and became a lieutenant in the Kai-iwi Yeomanry Cavalry Volunteers. Bryce was proud of his commission, but an incident at William Handley's woolshed in November 1868 clouded his military career. Initially it was reported as an attack on a band of Hauhau warriors, killing two and wounding others and where Bryce was "prominent and set the men a gallant example" according to his commanding officer. Later reports had the Māori as a group of unarmed boys, aged from ten to twelve.

The incident in which Bryce was alleged to have taken part was reported as an attack on woman and children in the "History of New Zealand" published in 1883 and led to a successful libel action against the publisher George William Rusden. Ex-Governor Arthur Hamilton-Gordon supported publisher Rusden but when the case went to trial Bryce won and was awarded damages as it was proved no women were present at Handley's woolshed, and Bryce denied being directly involved. Gordon's involvement and the damaging trial publicity delayed his elevation to the British peerage.

Minister of Native Affairs

In 1871, Bryce was back in Parliament as MP for Wanganui to 1881, and then MP for Waitotara until 1887. From 1876 to 1879, he chaired the Native Affairs Committee and between 1879 and 1883, was the Minister of Native Affairs. He expanded the powers of the Native Land Court in order to facilitate the sale of Māori land, reduced the scope of the Native Department, and enforced the law against any Maori resisting land confiscation and sales. These actions made him deeply unpopular with Maori and Bishop Octavius Hadfield reported that west coast Māori called him Bryce kohuru (Bryce the murderer).

Parihaka

The alienation of Taranaki land was challenged by Te Whiti o Rongomai and Tohu Kākahi at Parihaka and their followers cultivated and planted confiscated land. When Bryce became Minister in 1879, two hundred Maori ploughmen were already imprisoned, and his introduction of the Confiscated Lands Inquiry and Maori Prisoners' Trials Act in 1879 allowed them to stay in prison awaiting trial for up to two years. By January 1881, his actions were being questioned in the British parliament, and he resigned to be replaced by the more moderate William Rolleston.

Rolleston was to be Native Minister only until October 1881, and in his last act, proclaimed that Parihaka inhabitants had fourteen days to comply with the law or faced confiscation of all their lands. Bryce became Native Minister, and on 5 November 1881 was at Parihaka at the head of 1,600 Armed Constabulary to arrest the leaders and disperse the village.

In April 1882 Premier John Hall privately criticised Bryce to the Attorney General and said he would resign 'unless Bryce turned over a new leaf'. When Bryce heard of this, he resigned, and the Hall Government fell. Bryce was re-appointed Native Minister under Premiers Frederick Whitaker and Harry Atkinson in 1882 to 1884.

Bryce lost his Waitotara seat in 1887. He was considered by some of his parliamentary supporters to be a possible replacement for Premier Harry Atkinson. Briefly he was Leader of the Opposition, but resigned from Parliament in 1891 for refusing to withdraw his criticism of the Premier. The Speaker, William Steward, ruled the criticism unparliamentary, and when Bryce refused to withdraw the words, "the House passed a vote of censure on him for not obeying the chair. He left the chamber, and never came back."

Footnotes

References

 Biography in 1966 Encyclopaedia of New Zealand
 

|-

|-

|-

|-

|-

|-

|-

1833 births
1913 deaths
Members of the Wellington Provincial Council
Members of the Cabinet of New Zealand
Members of the New Zealand House of Representatives
New Zealand farmers
Leaders of the Opposition (New Zealand)
Unsuccessful candidates in the 1887 New Zealand general election
New Zealand MPs for North Island electorates
Politicians from Glasgow
Scottish emigrants to New Zealand
19th-century New Zealand politicians
Parihaka